The George Darwin Lectureship is an award granted by the  Royal Astronomical Society to a 'distinguished and eloquent speaker' on the subject of Astronomy including astrochemistry, astrobiology and astroparticle physics. The award is named after the astronomer George Darwin and has been given annually since 1984. The speaker may be based in the UK or overseas.

George Darwin Lecturers 
Laureates of the award include:
2022: Alan Fitzsimmons
2021: Filippo Fraternali
2020: Ofer Lahav
2019: Chris Done
 2018: Stephen J. Smartt: "Kilonovae and the birth of multi-messenger astronomy" 
 2017 Catherine Heymans : Observing the Dark side of our Universe
 2016 Michael Kramer : Probing Einstein's Universe and its physics - the joy of being curious
 2015 Katherine Blundell : Rapid Evolution in Astronomy
 2014 James S. Dunlop : The Cosmic History of Star Formation
 2013 Eline Tolstoy : Galactic Palaeontology
 2012 Andrew Collier Cameron: Winds, Tides and the Migration of Hot Jupiters
 2011 Michael Turner : Connecting quarks to the cosmos
 2010 Carlos Frenk : The Small-Scale Structure of the Universe 
 2009 Neil Gehrels : SWIFT and its results
 2008 Alan Watson : The Birth of Cosmic Ray Astronomy on the Argentine Pampas 
 2007 Reinhard Genzel : The Massive Black Hole and Nuclear Star Cluster of the Milky Way
 2006 Michael Werner : The Spitzer Space Telescope:   Probing the universe with  Infrared Eyes
 2005 Joseph Silk : The Dark Side of the Universe
 2004 Mike Edmunds : The Elemental Universe
 2003 Anneila Sargent : The Formation of Planetary Systems
 2002 Ramesh Narayan : Evidence for the Black Hole Event Horizon
 2001 Wendy Freedman : The Expansion Rate of the Universe
 2000 Kip Thorne : Gravitational Waves: Opening a New Window onto the Universe.
 1999 Geoff Marcy : Extrasolar Planets
 1998 Michael Perryman : A Stereoscopic View of the Galaxy
 1997 Simon White : The Formation of Galaxies
 1996 Andrew Fabian : Broad Iron Lines from AGN: Test of Strong Gravity
 1995 Bohdan Paczyński : Gravitational micro-lensing and the search for dark matter
 1994 Scott Tremaine : Is the Solar System Stable?
 1993 Riccardo Giacconi : Recent observations from the Hubble Space Telescope
 1992 John Barrow : Unprincipled Cosmology
 1991 Sandra Faber : How galaxies (probably) formed
 1990 Andre Maeder : Massive Stars in Galaxies
 1989 Roger Blandford : Gravitational Lenses
 1988 Roger Tayler : The Sun as a Star
 1987 Wal Sargent : Observing the evolution of large scale structure in the Universe
 1986 Gerald Neugebauer : Infrared astronomy
 1985 Robert Wilson: A perspective of ultraviolet astronomy
 1984 Icko Iben : The life of an intermediate mass star - in isolation/in a close binary

See also

 List of astronomy awards

References

Astronomy prizes
Royal Astronomical Society